William Berewald (August 5, 1874 – April 15, 1963) was an American gymnast. He competed in four events at the 1904 Summer Olympics.

References

External links
 

1874 births
1963 deaths
American male artistic gymnasts
Olympic gymnasts of the United States
Athletes (track and field) at the 1904 Summer Olympics
Gymnasts at the 1904 Summer Olympics
Sportspeople from Cleveland